South Heaton was a ward of Newcastle City Council in Newcastle upon Tyne, England. It covers the southern part of the Heaton district, and some north eastern parts of neighbouring Byker. It was abolished in 2018 and replaced by a new ward named Heaton.

The population of the ward taken at the 2011 Census was 9,964.

References

Wards of Newcastle upon Tyne